A History of the Crusades by Steven Runciman, published in three volumes during 1951–1954 (vol. I - The First Crusade and the Foundation of the Kingdom of Jerusalem; vol. II - The Kingdom of Jerusalem and the Frankish East, 1100-1187; vol. III - The Kingdom of Accre and the Later Crusades), is an influential work in the historiography of the Crusades, including the events that led up to these expeditions to the Holy Land and an extensive study of primary sources.

It has seen numerous reprints and translations and in some respects has come to be seen as a standard work on the topic.
Its scope encompasses the ascendancy of Islam in the Levant during the early 7th century through the fall of Acre in 1291, with later chapters covering through 1464, the time of pope Pius II.

The work draws on a wide range of primary sources (in Greek, Latin, Armenian, Arabic). 
At the time of its initial publication it offered a novel interpretation of the crusades, less as a defensive war of Christendom against the threat of Islamic expansion but as a continuation of the destructive "barbarian invasions" that led to the fall of Rome.
Furthermore, Runciman includes the history of the Byzantine Empire in his scope, moving his focus further east and at the same time tempering the "Romantic" view of the crusades as a heroic or chivalrous enterprise.

The review of the first volume by Egyptian historian Aziz Atiya was generally positive, with the view that the work would fill a much needed gap between René Grousset's work published in 1934 and the planned Wisconsin Collaborative History of the Crusades (for which Runciman contributed four chapters). Runciman's approach, while it may have had value in overcoming overly romantic views of the crusades held in the 19th century, has not aged well, and is now seen as having gone beyond the mark by painting the crusaders as "simpletons or barbarians".
Thomas F. Madden (2002) called the work  "terrible history yet wonderfully entertaining." 

This criticism might have been encouraged by Runciman's own attitude, which embraced subjectivity and polemics. He described his approach in the first volume of A History of the Crusades as his "one pen against the massed typewriters of the United States".  Runciman believed that, "The historian must attempt to add to his subjective study the qualities of intuitive sympathy and imaginative perception, without which he cannot hope to comprehend the fears and aspirations and convictions that have moved past generations."  This statement is a key to understanding his unique style but also explains much of the criticism leveled at it.

It is nevertheless undisputed that the work contains genuine scholarship and has been very influential on the generation of scholars educated during the 1950s to 1970s.
Bernard Hamilton wrote in 2000: "The first two volumes of Sir Steven’s History of the Crusades were published while I was an undergraduate.  I read them with avidity […] I still think that his History is one of the great literary works of English historical writing, which has inspired an interest in and enthusiasm for the crusades in a whole generation."

References

1951 non-fiction books
1952 non-fiction books
1954 non-fiction books
Books about the Crusades
20th-century history books
Cambridge University Press books
Book series introduced in 1951